Drouin railway station is located in Drouin, Victoria along the Gippsland railway line. It opened on 1 March 1878.

History

Drouin opened on 1 March 1878, when the line was extended from Bunyip to Moe. The station, like the township itself, was supposedly named after a Frenchman invented a chlorination process for the extraction of gold and metals from ore, or an Aboriginal word meaning 'north wind'.

In 1950, the line to Warragul was duplicated, and in 1952, duplication of the line to Longwarry occurred. The present island platform was provided in 1958.

The signal box at Drouin closed in February 1988, with the block post abolished, all fixed signals covered and lights extinguished. The interlocked signal frame was also abolished. By October 1989, all former sidings and crossovers, and the associated overhead wire, were abolished, effectively leaving Drouin as a "through" station.

In 2006, the station building underwent a refurbishment. During this time, it received Viclink purple station signage, the first station on the regional rail network to receive this signage.

Platforms and services

Drouin has one island platform with two faces. It is serviced by V/Line Traralgon and Bairnsdale line services.

Platform 1:
  services to Southern Cross in the morning and early afternoon
  services to Traralgon and Bairnsdale in the late afternoon and evening

Platform 2:
  services to Traralgon and Bairnsdale in the morning and early afternoon
  services to Southern Cross in the late afternoon and evening

Transport links

Warragul Bus Lines operates four routes via Drouin station, under contract to Public Transport Victoria:
 : to Warragul station
 : to Drouin North
 Garfield station – Traralgon Plaza
 Traralgon station – Drouin North

References

External links

Victorian Railway Stations Gallery
Melway map

Railway stations in Australia opened in 1878
Regional railway stations in Victoria (Australia)
Transport in Gippsland (region)
Shire of Baw Baw